In theoretical computer science, in particular in automated theorem proving and term rewriting,
the containment, or encompassment, preorder (≤) on the set of terms, is defined by
s ≤ t if a subterm of t is a substitution instance of s.
It is used e.g. in the Knuth–Bendix completion algorithm.

Properties

 Encompassment is a preorder, i.e. reflexive and transitive, but not anti-symmetric, nor total
 The corresponding equivalence relation, defined by s ~ t if s ≤ t ≤ s, is equality modulo renaming.
 s ≤ t whenever s is a subterm of t.
 s ≤ t whenever t is a substitution instance of s.
 The union of any well-founded rewrite order R with (<) is well-founded, where (<) denotes the irreflexive kernel of (≤). In particular, (<) itself is well-founded.

Notes

References

Rewriting systems
Order theory